Acorn is an artist's book written by Yoko Ono published in 2013 by Algonquin Books as a follow up to her Grapefruit book of conceptual art.

The book gathers together 100 brief thought experiments. Ono illustrates each proposal with pointillist “dot drawings”.

Background
Ono created the concept for the book in 1996, when she was experimenting with digital art. It was inspired by a 1969 Fluxus by Plastic Ono Band, a group Ono and John Lennon were members of, in which they had planted acorns at Coventry Cathedral for peace. Subsequently, they mailed other acorns to world leaders with a note: "Enclosed in this package we are sending you two living sculptures — which are acorns — in the hope that you will plant them in your garden and grow two oak-trees for world peace."

References

Works by Yoko Ono
2013 books
Artists' books
Fluxworks
Conceptual art
Fluxus